Rubtsovsk is a city in Altai Krai, Russia, located on the Aley River (Ob's tributary)  southwest of Barnaul. Population:    167,000 (1975); 111,000 (1959); 38,000 (1939).

History
It was founded in 1892.

A number of anti-Semitic incidents took place in the city in 1945.

During the 2022 Russian invasion of Ukraine, the city was the home city of several soldiers associated with the Bucha massacre and also a major destination for Ukrainian war loot.

Administrative and municipal status
Within the framework of administrative divisions, Rubtsovsk serves as the administrative center of Rubtsovsky District, even though it is not a part of it. As an administrative division, it is incorporated separately as the city of krai significance of Rubtsovsk—an administrative unit with the status equal to that of the districts. As a municipal division, the city of krai significance of Rubtsovsk is incorporated as Rubtsovsk Urban Okrug.

Transportation
The Rubtsovsk Airport is a derelict airfield which is used most commonly by local youth for drag racing.

Climate

Notable people

Raisa Gorbachyova, activist and wife of former Soviet leader Mikhail Gorbachev
Yevgeni Kryukov, association football player
Boris Eifman, ballet choreographer
Vladimir Ryzhkov, politician
Aleksei Tishchenko, boxer
Yekaterina Lobaznyuk, gymnast
Vladimir Galouzine, tenor

Cultural references
Novelist Esther Hautzig recounts her experiences in Rubtsovsk during World War II in The Endless Steppe.

Twin towns and sister cities

 Grants Pass, Oregon, United States
 Tacheng, China
 Patos de Minas, Brazil

References

Notes

Sources

Cities and towns in Altai Krai
Populated places established in 1892
1892 establishments in the Russian Empire